Caodaism is a monotheistic syncretic new religious movement officially established in the city of Tây Ninh in southern Vietnam in 1926.

Adherents engage in practices such as prayer, veneration of ancestors, nonviolence, and vegetarianism with the goal of union with God and freedom from saṃsāra. Estimates of the number of Caodaists in Vietnam vary; government figures estimate 4.4 million Caodaists affiliated to the Cao Đài Tây Ninh Holy See, with numbers rising up to 6 million if other branches are added. However, estimates vary. The United Nations found about 2.5 million Cao Dai followers in Vietnam as of January 2015. An additional number of adherents in the tens of thousands, primarily ethnic Vietnamese, live in North America, Cambodia, Europe and Australia as part of the Cao Dai diaspora.

History
Ngô Văn Chiêu, a district head of the French administration in Cochinchina, was the first to worship and receive messages from Cao Đài in 1921. He received a vision of the Divine Eye which is now the symbol for Cao Đài as well as the focus for worship on all Cao Đài altars.

Adherents maintain that on Christmas Eve 1925, God identified himself to the first group of Cao Đài mediums, which included Phạm Công Tắc, Cao Quỳnh Cư and Cao Hoài Sang. These three figures were to play an essential role in the growing religion as the three founding spirit mediums of the Hiệp Thiên Đài or "Palace Uniting Heaven and Earth".

On 7 October 1926, Lê Văn Trung (a former elected official of the Colonial Council of Cochinchina and a member of the ), and a leading group of 27 Caodaists, the first disciples of Cao Đài, signed the "Declaration of the Founding of the Cao Đài Religion" and presented it to the French Governor of Cochinchina. The Cao Đài faith brought together a number of once underground sects into a new national religion.

Officially called the "Great Way of the Third Time of Redemption", it became popular in its first few decades, gathering over a million members and converting a fifth to a fourth of the population of Cochinchina by 1940.
Ngô Văn Chiêu, who had never intended Cao Đài to become a mass organization, left the movement and eventually established in 1932 an independent, esoteric branch known as Chiếu Minh, headquartered in Vĩnh Long, which still exists and only admits a limited number of committed adepts.

In the 1930s, the leader criticized the French colonial regime, though he also emphasized dialogue with the French. This stance was controversial, and contrasted with the liturgy of dozens of "dissident" branches of Caodaism that followed a more Taoist model.

During the First and Second Indochina Wars, members of Cao Đài (along with several other Vietnamese sects, such as Hòa Hảo) were active in political and military struggles against both French colonial forces and South Vietnamese Prime Minister Ngô Đình Diệm.

Their criticism of the communist forces until 1975 was a factor in their repression after the fall of Saigon in 1975, when the incoming communist government banned the practice of Caodaism. In 1997, Caodaism was granted legal recognition and unrestricted practice once again.

Religious mission

Translated directly it means "The Third Great Universal Religious Amnesty" ( – "Great Faith",  – "Third Period",  – "to announce" and  – "to save"). 

According to Cao Đài's dogma, this Third Period will be of intense religious activity which will unite God and humanity in ways not yet imagined. Cao Đài also states that the Third Amnesty will establish a new great faith for the salvation of living beings before the universal destruction. The primary objective of the Third Amnesty is the unity of all religions, which will bring mankind together in a universal family for universal peace.

Caodaism teaches that, throughout human history, God the Father has revealed his truth many times through the mouths of many prophets, but these messages were always either ignored or forgotten due to humanity's susceptibility to secular desires. Adherents believe that the age has now come when God speaks to humanity directly.

In the nineteenth century, Spiritism became established in Europe. The likes of Madam Blavatsky, Allan Kardec and Victor Hugo championed new religious possibilities. In Vietnam, the age-old traditions of Asian divination and mediumship began to mix with the new traditions of European Spiritism.

To highlight this objective of unity, there is a representation of the Divine Covenant of The Third Amnesty (The Third Alliance) inside every Cao Đài Temple. This Covenant between Heaven and Earth is written and presented to humanity by the Venerable Saints – Victor Hugo, Sun Yat Sen and Trạng Trình Nguyễn Bỉnh Khiêm. Their mission is said to guide humanity into the way of the Third Amnesty. The Covenant is written in French: ; and in Chinese: . This translates into English as: "God and Humanity [for] Love and Justice."

Theology and theosophy

God

"Cao Đài" refers to God the Father (the Supreme Being, the Creator, the Ultimate Reality of the Universe, also identified as the Jade Emperor). , as God's full title, indicates a combination of the three main religions – Confucianism, Taoism, and Mahayana Buddhism.
   literally means "High Tower/Palace", that is, the place where God reigns over the universe. These words represent Confucianism.

 is the largest rank in Taoism.

 literally means Great Bodhisattva the Great Being (Mahasattva) in Buddhism.
Together, they represent not only the unification of the three main religions but also the humility of God who presents himself as the lowest rank of Divinity.

Cosmology

Before the creation of the universe there was the "dao", the infinite, nameless, formless, unchanging, eternal source. The negative and positive principles of the universe are the components of the eternal nature.

They represent respectively the yang and yin forces.  is viewed as the heart of the universe, the common Father of all beings. He imparts part of him into each living being, including even rocks, in the form of consciousness.  is venerated as the Mother of the universe, responsible for giving visible forms, consciousness and emotions to all life.

All other Divine Beings are to obey the orders of these two Creators during the course of evolution of the universe. Each of them carries a specific role as designated by their Father and Mother. Any being who falls out against them is considered devils in nature. These devils are led by the most powerful being, named Kim Quang Sứ (Satan).

In terms of the cosmos, faithful Caodaists believe there are heaven and hell, which are the main destinations for souls after death. Heaven consists of thirty six planes and many heavenly realms upon each of them, e.g. the Realm of Saints, the Realm of the Holy Mother, the Realm of the Perfect Beings, the Divine Court Realm, The Paradise of Extreme Joy, etc. Meanwhile, hell has ten key realms to carry out punishments in accordance with sins of souls.

In order to go to heaven, souls are required to cultivate their virtues and/or devote themselves to spiritual causes. Without merit from the latter, they cannot escape the cycle of birth and death, but can improve their virtues and merit gradually to reach better places in the universe, including the 72 planets (Earth being the 68th), the 3,000 worlds, the four great cosmic regions, and the thirty six heavenly planes. True liberation can only be attained when souls ultimately rejoin God the Father in Heaven.

Three-fold revelation
The father of the universe, Cao Đài, is believed to have communed with men since the beginning of times, revealing his will. According to Cao Đài doctrine, history is divided into three times of revelation. In the first two periods, there were teachings of Dipankara Buddha, sages, Phục Hy/Fu Xi, Gautama Buddha, Laozi, Confucius and Jesus, who received the will of the Highest Power, and founded their respective religions to serve and/ or educate humanity. However, due to the frailty of the messengers and the common men, the will of the Highest Power was misled into corrupted forms. Caodaists also believe that former revelations were culture-bound, being applicable only for certain ethnicities, and primarily intended for specific ages. The third and final form of revelation is disclosed through the teachings of the Cao Đài faith.

Twelve-fold hierarchy
Below those ranks are the spirits of matters, plants, animals and humans. All spirits may evolve to attain higher rank based on present deeds. Disembodied spirits fulfill a number of roles: they are benefactors of mankind, messengers and instructors of the truth. Quan Âm is regarded as the exemplary goddess of the Buddhas, Lý Bạch (Li Bai) of the Immortals, and Quan Vũ (Guan Yu) of the Saints.

The Cao Đài pantheon counts three main prophets, as illustrated on a plaque at the entrance of the Tay Ninh Temple: Victor Hugo (to please the French), since he gave many teachings and also the text of a number of important prayers. He himself practiced spiritism on the island of Jersey from 1852 to 1855, and predicted that he would become the prophet of a new religion to merge European and Asian mysticism. Sun Yat-sen (for the Chinese) and Trang Trinh, the Vietnamese Nostradamus (for the Vietnamese).

Fundamental rules and values
The doctrines of the Cao Đài faith tends not only to reconcile all religious views, but also to adapt itself to all degrees of spiritual evolution. A basic principle of Caodaism is "All Religions are One". Cao Đài has been described from five different points of view:
From a moral point of view, Cao Đài Religion reminds people of their duties towards themselves, their family, their society (a broader family), then toward humanity (the universal family).
From a philosophical point of view, Cao Đài Religion preaches renunciation of honors, riches and luxury, in other words, deliverance from servitude to materialism in the attainment of full spiritual quietude of soul.
From the point of view of worship, Cao Đài Religion prescribes the adoration of God, the veneration of Divine Beings and the worship of ancestors.
From a spiritual point of view, Cao Đài Religion confirms, in harmony with other religions, the existence of the spirits and the soul, their survival beyond the physical body, and their evolution by successive reincarnations, according to the Karmic Law.
From the initiates' point of view, Cao Đài Religion communicates to worthy adherents and reveals teachings that enable them, by a process of spiritual evolution, to reach the ecstasies of happiness.

Worship rituals
Believers worship God the Father, Holy Mother, and the Divine Beings with all their heart. They also venerate the Great Religious Prophets of history and honour the ancestors.

There are four daily ceremonies, that is, at 06:00, Midday, 18:00, and midnight, either at the temple or in front of the home altar. Monthly rituals take place at midnight on the 1st and 15th days of the lunar month. There is also a special anniversary ceremony once a year for God the Father, the Holy Mother, the five founders of the world's major religions, and the founders of the Cao Dai religion.
The rituals differ between places, depending on who they pray to.
At the Holy See: Prayers include incense offering, ceremony opening, prayer to the Jade Emperor (God the Father), prayer to Dipankara Buddha (Buddhism), prayer to Thái Thượng Lão Quân or Taishang Laojun (Taoism), prayer to Confucius (Confucianism), one of the three jewel offering prayers (flower, wine, and tea), and the five pledges.
At the Holy Mother temple: Prayers include incense offering, ceremony opening, prayer describing the role of the Holy Mother, prayer to express gratitude to the Holy Mother, one of the three jewel offering prayers (flower, wine, and tea), and the five pledges.
There are also differences between monthly rituals, and anniversary ones.

Ceremonial prescriptions such as actions, dress and music were organized in detail by God the Father. These include ceremonies for initiations, marriages and funerals. Particular attention is paid to death, and it has been revealed to the religion how the soul journeys towards heaven and how, on earth, co-religionists can pray for souls to help them on their way.

Symbols
Cao Đài temples and religious buildings host a rich array of symbols, all of which are instructed by either God the Father or Divine Beings. No symbol is redundant, and none is meaningless. They each tell a different story that reveals the beliefs, values, cosmic secrets, prophecies, etc. When combined, they lay out the journey of the Tao throughout the history of mankind and the universe, as well as its way forward.

The Divine Eye

In spirit and in pictorial representation, the Eye serves to remind Cao Đài believers that the God witnesses everything, everywhere, constantly. At the Holy See, there are in total 50 Divine Eyes of five different shapes; each carrying a different meaning related to various spiritual aspects. The One on the globe shows the Supreme Being above the North Star in the Ursa Minor constellation. The One on the façade of the Holy See has 35 rays of light which represent the three major religions and five main religious doctrines of the world. At the local Cao Đài Temples, the Divine Eye has 16 rays of light emanating from it. Nine radiate upward representing the nine levels of heaven, and seven radiating downward representing the seven emotions, which believers must control.

The religious banner and emblem
In accordance with the religious mission, the three colors of Cao Đài banner represent the three main non-Hinduistic Asian religions of the world; yellow stands for Buddhism, blue for Taoism, and red for Confucianism. Under the Divine Eye is the religious emblem which also represents the essence of the three religions; the bowl of charity for Buddhist compassion and asceticism, the feather duster for Taoist purification; the Spring and Autumn Annals for Confucianist virtue and love.

Holy scriptures
There are various Caodaist scriptures. Some of those belonging to the Holy See of Tây Ninh are: Kinh Thiên Đạo Và Thế Đạo ("Prayers of the Heavenly and the Earthly Way"), Pháp Chánh Truyền ("the Religious Constitution of Cao Đài Religion"), Tân Luật ("The Canonical Codes"),  and Con Đường Thiêng Liêng Hằng Sống ("Divine Path to Eternal Life"). Other sects have additional scriptures.

The Canonical Codes
This scripture sets out the rules and boundaries for different aspects of the religion, from a believer to the Pope, from education to marriage, etc. There are ten sections in the scripture with the following content:
Hierarchy of religious dignitaries
Initiation and ranks of believers
Establishment of a parish
The five interdictions
The four commandments
Education
Sanctions
Promulgation of laws and regulations
Secular rules
The house of meditation

The Religious Constitution
The Phap-Chanh-Truyen (The Religious Constitution of Caodaism) was delivered to the religion as a series of divine messages. These are the guiding texts of the religion's organisation, stipulating the authority, responsibility, limits, as well as religious vestment for each rank in the religion.

Organisational structure

The organisational structure of the Caodaist church has similarities with that of a state. There are similarities between the hierarchy of the Caodaist clergy and that of the Catholic Church. Besides the Pope, the Caodaist hierarchy has Cardinals, Bishops, Priests, and further ranks.

Caodaism stresses equality among men and women in society. However, in the spiritual domain, ordained women may not attain the two highest positions: the Legislative Cardinal and the Pope. The church claims this is ordered by the Highest Lord, who declared that because Dương (Yang) represents male and Âm (Yin) corresponds to female, Yin cannot dominate Yang spiritually or else chaos ensues.

The Religion is governed by two powers, the spiritual and earthly ones.

The spiritual power (Bát Quái Đài): This is the heavenly council, that is, the Spirit and Soul of the New Religion. The council directs all activities of the universe. The council is the invisible part, made up of the Divine Beings, and directed by Duc Cao Dai (God the Father). The Divine Beings represent different religions of the world, including:
Founders of five religions: Shakyamuni (Buddhism), Lao Tze (Taoism), Confucius (Confucianism), Jesus Christ (Christianity), Jiang Ziya (Geniism).
Founders and teachers of Caodaism, who represent the doctrines of Buddhism, Taoism and Confucianism: Guanyin (Buddhism), Li Bai (Taoism), Guan Yu (Confucianism).

The earthly power: To avoid dictatorship, God divided the earthly power into two bodies – an Executive Body (Cửu Trùng Đài) headed by the Pope, and a Legislative Body (Hiệp Thiên Đài) headed by the Hộ Pháp (Protector of Laws and Justice). The former takes charge of the administration of the Religion and its missionary activities, while the latter oversees legislation, jurisdiction and communication with God or Divine Beings. There is also the Charitable Body placed under the supervision of the Legislative Body, and a Lay Committee of selected professional specialists among worthy followers.

The Executive Body (Cửu Trùng Đài)
The Cửu Trùng Ðài is the Executive Body of Caodaism which takes charge of the administration of the Religion and missionary activities. Head of Cửu Trùng Ðài is Giáo-Tông (Pope).

There are nine ranks in its hierarchy:
One Pope
Three Censor Cardinals
Three Cardinals
Thirty six Archbishops
Seventy two Bishops
Three thousand Priests
Student Priest (no limit)
Subdignitaries (no limit)
Followers (no limit)

For male dignitaries of the Executive Body, from the rank of Censor Cardinal to that of Student Priest, each echelon is subdivided into three branches corresponding to the three principal religions:
Buddhist Branch: These dignitaries are dressed in yellow.
Taoist Branch: These dignitaries are dressed in azure.
Confucianist Branch: These dignitaties are dressed in red.
Dignitaries of the same echelon, either Confucianist, Taoist or Buddhist, have the same attributes.

At the Holy See, there are three governing councils:
The Popular Council: composed of Student Priests, Sub-dignitaries and representatives of adherents in the ratio of one delegate per 500 members. The Popular Council makes plans for the future.
The Sacerdotal Council: composed of Priests, Bishops, Archbishops and Principal Archbishops. The Sacerdotal Council examines the plans made by the Popular Council.
The High Council: composed of Cardinals, Legislative Body Cardinals and the Pope.
All plans made by the Popular Council and favoured by the Sacerdotal Council are submitted to High Council for approval.

In addition, there is also a Central Administration body chaired by three Cardinals. Each of them is assisted by three Principal Archbishops to oversee three religious ministries:
The Principal Archbishops of the Buddhist branch take care of finances, supply, and public works.
The Principal Archbishops of the Taoist branch take care of education, health, and agriculture.
The Principal Archbishops of the Confucianist branch take care of interior, rites, and justice.

The administrative network which functions throughout Vietnam consists of:
The Religious Region (Trấn Đạo) comprising several provinces, headed by a Bishop who is called the Regional Religious Chief/ Khâm Trấn Đạo.
The Religious Province (Châu Đạo) comprising several districts/delegations, headed by a Priest who is called Provincial Religious Chief/ Khâm Châu Đạo.
The Religious District (Họ Đạo) comprising several villages, headed by a Student Priest who is called the Religious Chief of Delegation (Đầu Tộc Đạo/ Đầu Họ Đạo/ Đầu Phận Đạo).
The Religious Village (Hương Đạo) headed by a Sub-dignitary who is called Village Religious Chief (Đầu Hương Đạo). He is assisted by one (or more) Phó Trị Sự (Deputy Chief for Administration of a religious village) representing the Executive Body and one (or more) Thông Sự representing the Legislative Body. The Religious Village is made up of Religious Hamlets (Ấp Đạo).

The Legislative Body (Hiệp Thiên Đài)
This Body has the duty of communicating with Divine Beings, to preserve the religious laws and listen to the complaints of the unhappy. It is headed by the Hộ Pháp (protector of laws and justice), and assisted by the Thượng Phẩm (Director of religious affairs) and Thượng Sanh (Director of secular affairs).
Hộ-Pháp (護法) (The head of Legislative Body Affairs), is the one who unveils the Mystery of the Invisible and is the Maintainer of the Rules and Laws of the New Religion. He is the one who pronounces judgments on the dignitaries and adepts, elevates the dignity of the fervent through their merit and brings sanctions against those who have committed faults. The Hộ-Pháp holds control over the Legislative Body Power both exoterically and esoterically. He watches over the positive progress of the disciples in the Way of God, and guides all evolved souls to Bát-Quái-Đài for the union with Angels, Saints, Immortals and Buddhas.
Thượng-Phẩm (上品) (The head of Religious Affairs), is the Representative of the Ho-Phap in the formation of virtuous souls of the Sacerdotal Council. He depends on the Hộ-Pháp in all his missions. In a word, the Thượng-Phẩm helps the Cửu Trùng Đài to live in an atmosphere of happiness; he reveals the Heavenly Voice to virtuous souls, and guides them to the Divine Phase of the Great Spirits, while closing behind them the door of regression. He considers the priestly laws to take up the defence of all office-bearers and adepts; he prevents all perversion of the Divine Rules, and helps all initiates to attain their aim. He is simultaneously the President of the Hall of Defence and protector of all disciples. The Thượng-Phẩm is "Leader of the Spiritual Power".
Thượng–Sanh (上生) (The head of Secular Affairs), has control of all the laws and rules which relate to the worldly life of all adepts to guide them out of the sea of sufferings. He may present a formal complaint before the religious Tribunal against all those who impede the faithful as they move along the Way of God. He is the President of the Hall of Accusation.

Four "zodiacal dignitaries" under each of these branches carry the four key responsibilities of conservation, renovation, reformation, and legislation. They are further assisted by twelve technical academicians, including Bảo Huyền Linh Quân (Theosophy), Bảo Tinh Quân (Astronomy), Bảo Cô Quân (Orphanage), Bảo Văn pháp quân (Culture), Bảo Học Quân (Education), Bảo Y Quân (Health), Bảo Vật Quân (Science and Industry, Bảo Sĩ Quân (Literature), Bảo Sanh Quân (Social work), Bảo Nông Quân (Agriculture), Bảo Công Quân (Public Works), Bảo Thương Quân (Economics).

Community structure
Any local area having more than 500 believers is authorized to establish a Parish (Họ Đạo/Tộc Đạo) with a Thánh-Thất (Temple, Church, Holy House) which is led by the authority of a dignitary.
Parish/Parishes can be established only with the permission and authority of the Giao-Tong/Pope.

Twice a month, the first and the fifteenth day of the lunar calendar, the believers must meet at the Thánh-Thất (Temple, Holy House) of the local area to attend the ceremony and listen to the teachings. Exception can be made for those with reasonable excuses.

The Holy See
At the centre of this city stands the Great Divine Temple. This temple, like the religion, is a fusion of world influences. As well as being a major centre of pilgrimage, the Caodaist Holy See is also one of Vietnam's major tourist attractions.

Branches
“The period between 1934 and 1975 witnessed not only the robust development of the Cao Dai religion but also saw the separation of the Cao Dai religion into different independent sects, sometimes as many as 30" As of July 2014, "central and provincial authorities have granted legal recognition" to 11 Cao Dai sects.

These sects generally divide along geographic lines. The largest is based in Tây Ninh Province, where the religion was founded in 1926 and where the seat of the Caodaist authority is located.

The Caodaist Executive Council of Tây Ninh Province received official government recognition in 1997. Independent Caodaist groups allege that government interference has undermined the independence of the Tây Ninh group, and it no longer faithfully upholds Cao Đài'''s principles and traditions. Religious training takes place at individual temples rather than at centralized seminaries. Some Caodaist sects that have broken away from the Tây Ninh Holy See are Cầu Kho, Bến Tre, Minh Chơn Lý, Minh Chơn Đạo, Tiên Thiên, and Hội Thánh Truyền Giáo Trung Việt. Ngô Văn Chiêu founded Chiếu Minh when he left the original church structure, refusing his appointment as Caodaism's first pope.

See also
Ama-gi 
Hòa Hảo
Jade Emperor
Nguyễn Thành Phương
Queen Mother of the WestSlave Ship, a science-fiction novel which involves Cao Đài and its pope.
Taoism
Three teachings
Trình Minh Thế
Xiantiandao
Yiguandao

References

Sources

"Caodaism" Encyclopedia entry by Janet Alison Hoskins at World Religion and Spirituality website https://wrldrels.org/2017/08/10/caodaism/ (accessed 10 August 2017) 0037768610375520

 

Further reading
Blagov, Sergei (2012). Caodaism: Vietnamese Traditionalism and Its Leap Into Modernity. Nova Science Publishers. 
Goossaert, Vincent; Palmer, David A. (2011). The Religious Question in Modern China. University of Chicago Press. 
Jammes, Jeremy (2010). Divination and Politics in Southern Vietnam: Roots of Caodaism''. Social Compass 57(3), 357–371. DOI: 10.1177/
Werner, Jayne (1981). Peasant Politics and Religious Sectarianism: Peasant and Priest in the Cao Dai in Vietnam. New Haven: Yale University Southeast Asian Studies.

External links
Official website of the Tay Ninh Holy See
CAODAI
Caodai de l’Europe
Caodaist French Resources

Cao Dai Library in Sydney (Multilingual)
Cao Dai Library in English
Cao Dai Ebooks in PDF, Kindle, Nook formats
Caodaist Overseas Missionary
Hội Văn Hóa Cao Đài – Caodaist Cultural Association, Australia

 
1926 establishments in Vietnam
Cultural depictions of Victor Hugo
Cultural depictions of Sun Yat-sen
Esoteric schools of thought
Monotheistic religions
Religion in Vietnam
Religious organizations established in 1926
Religious syncretism in Vietnam
Religions that require vegetarianism